A number of steamships have been named Pocahontas, including:

 , an ocean liner in service 1920–22
 , served under Virginia Ferry Corporation's Cape Charles—Little Creek ferry service; sold 1963 and renamed  operating as Cape May–Lewes Ferry 1964 to 1974
 , a Liberty ship in service 1942–60

Ship names